Sea Lion Rock (Sivuchiy Kamen), is a rock islet just off Medny Island in the Commander Islands archipelago, in the Bering Sea.

The nearest mainland area is the Kamchatka Peninsula, in Kamchatka Krai, Russia.

See also
Islands of the Commander Islands
Islands of the Russian Far East

Islands of the Commander Islands
Islands of the Bering Sea
Islands of the Russian Far East
Islands of Kamchatka Krai